Miriam O'Callaghan (Miriam Ní Cheallacháin) became the 26th president of the Camogie Association when she defeated Helen McAleevy of Down 39-27 at the 2003 congress in the Arklow Bay Hotel.

Presidency
Her presidency was distinguished by new marketing initiatives including a brash and high-profile centenary "‘chicks with sticks"‘ campaign.

She renegotiated, with the assistance of Leinster Chairman Liam O'Neill, the twinning of the camogie finals with the under-21 hurling final, an arrangement that lasted from 2006 to 2009.

She initiated moves to integrate the camogie association and GAA.

Centenary
In 2004 she unveiled a plaque at Navan to celebrate the centenary of the Camogie Association. The Association celebrated 100 years with a Gala Banquet, the announcement of the Team of the Century and numerous other events. The first All Star team was announced in December 2004. As part of the centenary celebrations, RTÉ covered the All Ireland semi-finals live on television for the first time.

Other roles
While Camogie President she was appointed to serve on the Broadcasting Complaints Commission. After her presidency she was elected Chair of Offaly Sports Partnership.

References

Living people
Gaelic games players from County Offaly
Presidents of the Camogie Association
Year of birth missing (living people)